Cape Three Forks, Cape des Trois Fourches, or Cape Tres Forcas is a headland on the Mediterranean coast of northeastern Morocco.

Geography
The cape is a large mountainous promontory of North Africa into the Mediterranean Sea. For centuries, this cape has provided both a nautical landmark and a maritime hazard for ships in the Alboran Sea.  The Spanish exclave of Melilla surrounds a smaller cape on the eastern side of the peninsula.

Names

In antiquity, the cape was known to the Phoenicians and Carthaginians as Rusadir, giving its name to a nearby port (now Melilla). The name meant "Powerful" or "High Cape", but can also be understood as "Cape of the Powerful One", in reference to Baal, Tanit, and other important Punic god.

It is also known in Arabic as Ras Uarc.

History
On 26 August 1923 the  ran aground and eventually wrecked on the cape.

Lighthouse

A lighthouse is located in the north end of the cape. It is a gray tower on white two-story dwelling.

Maraboutism 
At least 11 locations in the Cape Three Forks have been identified as places of pious reflection, either small hermitages, bushes or trees, five of them featuring the tomb of the marabout.

Ecology

Cape Three Forks is a Ramsar designated site with no. 1473. It hosts different species, some of them threatened, such as the monk seal, two species of limpets (Patella ferruginea and Patella nigra), the loggerhead turtle, the fin whale and two species of dolphin (Tursiops truncatus and Delphinus delphis). The main activities taking place in the area are fishing and tourism.

References

Citations

Bibliography
 .
 .
 . 
 .
 .

External links

Cape Tres Forcas on Wikimapia

Three Forks
Geography of Oriental (Morocco)
Ramsar sites in Morocco